Timchenko is a surname. Notable people with the surname include:

 Dimitriy Timchenko (born 1983), Ukrainian Greco-Roman wrestler
 Galina Timchenko (born 1962), Russian journalist 
 Gennady Timchenko (born 1952), businessman, active in the energy trading
 Ilona Timchenko (born 1976), Russian pianist and composer
 Oleg Timchenko, contemporary painter and founder of the “10th Floor Group”
 Stanislav Timchenko (born 1983), Russian figure skater
 Sergei Timchenko (born 1972), Ukrainian politician and sportsman

See also
 
 Tymchenko

Ukrainian-language surnames